Plamen Stamov (born 14 January 1954) is a Bulgarian bobsledder. He competed in the four man event at the 1988 Winter Olympics.

References

1954 births
Living people
Bulgarian male bobsledders
Olympic bobsledders of Bulgaria
Bobsledders at the 1988 Winter Olympics
Place of birth missing (living people)